The governor of Wisconsin is the head of government of Wisconsin and the commander-in-chief of the state's army and air forces. The governor has a duty to enforce state laws, and the power to either approve or veto bills passed by the Wisconsin Legislature, to convene the legislature, and to grant pardons, except in cases of treason and impeachment.

44 individuals have held the office of governor of Wisconsin since the state's admission to the Union in 1848, one of whom—Philip La Follette—served non-consecutive terms. Nelson Dewey, the first governor, took office on June 7, 1848. The longest-serving governor was Tommy Thompson, who took office on January 5, 1987, and resigned on February 1, 2001, a total of 14 years and 28 days. Arthur MacArthur Sr. had the shortest term: he was governor for a total of just 5 days—from March 21 to 25, 1856. The current governor is Tony Evers, a Democrat who took office on January 7, 2019.

Governors

Initially after the American Revolution, parts of the area now known as Wisconsin were claimed by Virginia, Massachusetts and Connecticut; however, Virginia ceded its claim in 1784, Massachusetts in 1785 and Connecticut in 1786. On July 13, 1787, the Northwest Territory, including the area now called Wisconsin, was formed; Wisconsin remained part of the territory until 1800. The territorial governor during this period was Arthur St. Clair. As parts of the Northwest Territory were admitted to the Union as states, Wisconsin became part of first the Indiana Territory (1800–1809), then the Illinois Territory (1809–1818), and then the Michigan Territory (1818–1836); see the lists of governors of Indiana, of Illinois, and of Michigan for these periods.

Governors of Wisconsin Territory

Wisconsin Territory was formed on July 3, 1836. During the time of its existence, the Wisconsin Territory had 3 territorial governors, 1 of whom served non-consecutive terms, and 1 who continued on as acting governor after the territory had officially ceased to exist.

Governors of the State of Wisconsin

Wisconsin was admitted to the Union on May 29, 1848. Since then, it has had 45 governors, one of whom served non-consecutive terms.

Originally, governors of Wisconsin served for two-year terms, but in 1967 the state constitution was amended to change this to four. Jeremiah McLain Rusk served 1 3-year term in the 1880s as the constitution was amended during his first term to move elections from odd to even years, and all officers were allowed to serve an extra year, rather than have their terms cut a year short. Patrick Lucey, elected in the 1970 election, was the first governor to serve a 4-year term. Governors of Wisconsin are not term limited.

The state constitution provides for the election of a lieutenant governor; originally, the governor and lieutenant governor were elected on different tickets, and thus were not necessarily of the same party. Since the 1967 amendment, however, the two have been nominated, and voted on, together. Originally, if the office of the governor was vacant for any reason, "the powers and duties of the office . . . devolve[d] upon the lieutenant governor." In 1979, the constitution was amended to make this more specific: if the governor dies, resigns, or is removed from office, the lieutenant governor becomes governor, but becomes acting governor if the governor is absent from the state, impeached, or unable to carry out of duties. If any of these events occur while the office of lieutenant governor is vacant, the secretary of state becomes either governor or acting governor. Two Wisconsin governors have died while in office, one has died after being elected but before taking office, and four have resigned.

 Parties

Notes

References

General

 

Constitution

Specific

External links

Office of the Governor of Wisconsin

Lists of state governors of the United States
 
Governors
Lists of territorial governors of the United States